"Look into My Eyes" is a song performed by American hip hop group Bone Thugs-n-Harmony, written by members Krayzie Bone, Layzie Bone, Bizzy Bone and Wish Bone, Anthony Eugene Cowan, and producer Tim "DJ U-Neek" Middleton. It was released on June 3, 1997, via Ruthless and Relativity Records as the third single from Music from and Inspired by the "Batman & Robin" Motion Picture and lead single from Bone Thugs-n-Harmony's third studio album The Art of War. Recording sessions took place at Studio Cat and at U-Neeks Workshop in Los Angeles.

In the United States, the single peaked at number four on both the Billboard Hot 100 and the Hot R&B/Hip-Hop Songs. On November 24, 1997, it was certified platinum by the Recording Industry Association of America for sales of one million copies. The song made it to number three in New Zealand and number sixteen in the UK Singles Chart. A music video was released for the single. Bizzy Bone did not appear in it, but the clips from the film were scattered throughout the video. A remix also produced by DJ U-Neek entitled "Look into My Eyes (Atlantis Remix)" was released on the compilation album The Collection: Volume Two.

Critical reception

Chuck Eddy of Entertainment Weekly wrote: "The staccato rap harmonies of these hugely popular Cleveland gangsta youngstas, Bone Thugs-N-Harmony, resulted in startling gospel beauty on earlier hits. "Look Into My Eyes", the first commercial single from the Batman & Robin soundtrack, aims for a hypnotic darkness but ultimately feels tired and trite: spiritless voices dragging themselves through formless tempo shifts over a beatless background blur". AllMusic critic gave the single 1.5 out of five stars.

Charts

Weekly charts

Year-end charts

Certifications

Release history

References

External links
 

1997 singles
1997 songs
Batman music
Batman (1989 film series)
Bone Thugs-n-Harmony songs
Epic Records singles
Relativity Records singles
Ruthless Records singles
Songs written by Bizzy Bone
Songs written by Krayzie Bone
Songs written by Layzie Bone
Songs written by Wish Bone